All Nippon Airways (ANA) Flight 58 was a Japanese domestic flight from Sapporo to Tokyo, operated by All Nippon Airways (ANA). On 30 July 1971, at 02:04 local time, a Japan Air Self-Defense Force (JASDF) F-86F Sabre jet fighter collided with the Boeing 727 airliner operating the flight, causing both aircraft to crash. All 162 people aboard the airliner were killed, while the Sabre pilot, a trainee with the JASDF, freed himself from his airplane after the collision and parachuted to safety. This incident led to the resignation of both the head of Japan's Defense Agency and the JASDF chief of staff.

Aircraft
The ANA airliner was a Boeing 727-281 with registration ; it was three months old at the time of the accident. The JASDF aircraft, belonging to the 1st Air Wing at Matsushima Airbase, was a Mitsubishi F-86F Sabre, a Japanese-built version of North American Aviation's famous fighter jet, with tail number 92-7932. At the time of the accident, the F-86F was one of the primary aircraft in the JASDF's inventory.

Passengers and crew
Most of the airline passengers came from Fuji in Shizuoka Prefecture and were returning from a trip to Hokkaido. Of the passengers, 125 were in a tour group made up of members of a society for relatives of Japanese servicemen killed in World War II. The pilot of Flight 58, Saburo Kawanishi, 41, had more than 8,000 hours of flying experience. He transmitted a brief emergency call between the time of the collision and the aircraft's disintegration.

Sequence of events
ANA Flight 58 departed Chitose Airport near Sapporo, with 155 passengers and a crew of 7 on board for a domestic flight to Tokyo's Haneda International Airport. Meanwhile, a 22-year-old JASDF trainee pilot and his instructor were practicing air combat manoeuvring in their two Sabres near Morioka, northern Honshū. The damage to the Boeing's tail caused it to go out of control; it entered a steep dive and disintegrated in mid-air, the wreckage impacting near the town of Shizukuishi in Iwate Prefecture. 

All 162 passengers and crew were killed. The Sabre, having lost its right wing, entered a spin that prevented the trainee pilot from ejecting, so he unbuckled his safety belts and freed himself from the aircraft. He deployed his parachute and landed safely. The Sabre plunged into a nearby rice paddy.

Aftermath
The JASDF pilots were later tried and the trainee was acquitted on a charge of involuntary manslaughter. However, the instructor was found guilty of criminally negligent manslaughter and sentenced to three years in prison, with a three-year suspension. He also lost his job. Keikichi Masuhara, Director-General of the Defense Agency (now Ministry of Defense) and General Yasuhiro Ueda, Chief of the Air Staff, resigned afterward to take responsibility for the incident.

The loss of Flight 58 was the deadliest civil aviation disaster at the time, surpassing the 1969 crash of Viasa Flight 742, and remained so until the crash of Aeroflot Flight 217 thirteen months later. It remains the deadliest accident suffered by All Nippon Airways, the second-deadliest involving a Boeing 727, behind Mexicana Flight 940, and the third-deadliest on Japanese soil behind Japan Airlines Flight 123 and China Airlines Flight 140.

See also

1983 Rhein-Main Starfighter crash
Gol Transportes Aéreos Flight 1907
Hughes Airwest Flight 706

Notes

References

External links
 "昭和47年度 運輸白書 - III 航空 第2章 航空事故 - 運輸省." [1972 White Paper on Transportation --III Aviation Chapter 2 Aviation Accidents --Ministry of Transport]  

1971 in Japan
Aviation accidents and incidents in 1971
Aviation accidents and incidents in Japan
Accidents and incidents involving the Boeing 727
Mid-air collisions
Mid-air collisions involving airliners
Mid-air collisions involving military aircraft
All Nippon Airways accidents and incidents
Airliner accidents and incidents caused by pilot error
July 1971 events in Asia
History of the Japan Air Self-Defense Force